Feeling Minnesota is a 1996 American crime comedy film written and directed by Steven Baigelman. It stars Keanu Reeves, Vincent D'Onofrio, Cameron Diaz, Tuesday Weld, Dan Aykroyd, and Delroy Lindo.

Plot
Ex-stripper Freddie Clayton (Cameron Diaz) is marrying her husband Sam (Vincent D'Onofrio) to repay a debt owed to nightclub owner Red (Delroy Lindo). When Freddie meets Jjaks (Keanu Reeves), Sam's brother, they instantly fall in love. Jjaks and Freddie decide to run off together, eventually staying in a motel. After realizing that they do not have any money, Freddie and Jjaks decide to go back and steal some of Sam's money. Sam catches Jjaks in the act and they fight. After escaping, Jjaks returns to the motel, unaware that Sam has been following him. After Jjaks passes out due to the fight, Sam ends up shooting Freddie in the stomach in Jjaks's car, and tries to frame the killing on him by returning Freddie's body to the motel room along with the murder weapon.

The next morning, Jjaks awakens, unable to recall anything that happened after his fight with Sam. Seeing Freddie's body in the room along with the gun, he briefly thinks that maybe he killed Freddie. After being tipped off by Sam, the police arrive but Jjaks hastily avoids capture, driving Freddie's body to a remote area in the woods to lay her to rest. All the while, Sam has been watching these events from afar, hoping for Jjaks's arrest.

Sam now calls a friend, Detective Ben Costikyan (Dan Aykroyd), who promptly arrests Jjaks. The trio, along with Costikyan's partner Lloyd (David Alan Smith), drive to where Freddie was supposedly buried. However, upon arrival, they are unable to find her. Angered at Sam for misleading him, Costikyan drives off with Lloyd, leaving the brothers beside the road.

Upon returning home, the brothers receive a phone call from the motel manager (Michael Rispoli), who, based on seeing Sam carrying Freddie's body into the motel room and Jjaks carrying the body out of the room, wants $50,000 to keep quiet. Jjaks now realizes that Sam was setting him up for Freddie's murder. After another fight, they decide that Jjaks will go to the motel to talk to the manager while Sam will see Red, hoping for a loan.

At this point, Red has learned that Sam has been stealing money from him for the past year. Sam ends up shooting and killing Red after a brief skirmish and collects the $50,000 from a safe. Jjaks meets with the motel manager but sees Freddie's necklace on the floor of the manager's apartment. Confused and angry, Jjaks throws the manager outside and threatens to kill him. Suddenly out of nowhere, an alive Freddie walks towards them, calling for Jjaks, who faints. When he revives, she shows Jjaks her bullet wound and tells him that Sam is a bad shot and that someone picked her up from the side of the road where he had left her body.

The next morning, Sam calls Jjaks and tells him he got the money. However, after seeing Freddie alive from a nearby diner, he confronts Jjaks and Freddie in the manager's apartment. Sam ends up getting shot when the couple try to defend themselves. Costikyan enters the hotel room and suffocates Sam by holding his hand against his mouth. It turns out that Freddie had called Costikyan after being rescued and used him to help her get the $50,000. A betrayed and wounded Jjaks is left helpless.

Some time later, Costikyan is arrested in his underwear inside a hotel, as Freddie had tipped off the cops and left with the money. She and Jjaks have since fallen out, but Jjaks, recalling her dream of being a dancer in Las Vegas, hitchhikes there. When he finds her living her dream, she happily says, "What took you so fucking long?" before they embrace.

Cast
 Keanu Reeves as Jjaks Clayton
 Vincent D'Onofrio as Sam Clayton
 Cameron Diaz as Freddie Clayton
 Delroy Lindo as Red
 Dan Aykroyd as Detective Ben Costikyan
 Courtney Love as Rhonda
 Tuesday Weld as Nora Clayton
 Aaron Michael Metchik as Young Sam Clayton
 Michael Rispoli as Motel Manager
 Arabella Field as Manager's Wife
 John Carroll Lynch as Cop
 Max Perlich as Desk Clerk
 Bill Hermann as Driver
 Russel Konstans as Joseph

Reception
, Rotten Tomatoes gave the film a 14% based on 21 reviews. However, Siskel & Ebert gave the film "two thumbs up."

Soundtrack

The film's soundtrack was released in August 1996 through Atlantic Records. The album received a mixed review from AllMusic reviewer Stephen Thomas Erlewine, ending his review with "the overall effect of the whole Feeling Minnesota juggernaut can't help but make you feel a little 'sick.' "

Track listing

References

External links

1996 films
1990s crime drama films
1990s black comedy films
American crime drama films
American black comedy films
Films set in Minnesota
Films shot in Minnesota
1990s English-language films
Films produced by Danny DeVito
1996 directorial debut films
1996 comedy films
1990s American films